Srećko (Felix) Albini (10 December 1869 – 18 April 1933) was a Croatian composer, conductor, and music publisher. He was primarily known for his operettas, some of which were adapted into English and performed in London and New York.

Life and career

Albini was born in Županja. He trained in music in Vienna and in Graz, but at the wishes of his family also graduated from a business college. His first engagement as a conductor was for the municipal theatres in Graz, where he worked from 1893 to 1895. He then became a conductor at the Croatian National Theatre in Zagreb, where he remained for the next eight years and composed his first stage work, the three-act opera Maričon. Set to a libretto by Milan Smrekar, it had a nationalistic theme and incorporated traditional Croatian folk music and dances. Maričon premiered at the Croatian National Theatre in 1901 and received a very favourable review from Die Musik.

The National Theatre's resident opera company suspended its activities between 1903 and 1909, and Albini moved to Vienna, where he continued composing and conducting.
He returned to the National Theatre in 1909, serving there as both a conductor and a stage director until 1919. However, he had ceased his activities as a composer after 1909. Albini went on to become a music publisher and also founded and ran the Croatian Copyright Centre. He died in Zagreb at the age of 63.

Works
According to the Croatian musicologist Ivan Zivanović, Albini's music combined "an exuberant melodic invention and skillful sense of drama [that] transcended the musical and dramatic limitations characteristic of operetta of his time." Albini's operettas include:
Der Nabob, operetta in 3 acts, libretto by Leopold Krenn; premiered at the Carltheater, Vienna, 1905
Madame Troubadour, vaudeville-operetta in 3 acts, libretto by Béla Jenbach and Robert Pohl; premiered at the Croatian National Theatre, Zagreb, 1907
Baron Trenck, comic operetta in 3 acts, libretto by Alfred Maria Willner and Robert Bodanzky; premiered at the Altes Stadttheater, Leipzig, 1908
Die Barfußtänzerin, operetta in 2 acts, libretto by Béla Jenbach; premiered at the Altes Stadttheater, Leipzig, 1909

Notes

References

External links
Complete score of Albini's Madame Troubadour at the International Music Score Library Project

1869 births
1933 deaths
Croatian classical composers
Male classical composers
Croatian musical theatre composers
Operetta composers